The 2005 Formula 3 Euro Series season was the third championship year of Europe's premier Formula Three series. The championship consisted of ten rounds – each with two races – held at a variety of European circuits. Each weekend consisted of one 60-minute practice session and two 30-minute qualifying sessions (one at Monaco), followed by one c.110 km race and one c.80 km race. Each qualifying session awarded one bonus point for pole position and each race awarded points for the top eight finishers, with ten points per win. Lewis Hamilton dominated the season, winning 15 of the 20 races and scoring nearly twice as many points as his nearest rival, team-mate Adrian Sutil. As of now, six drivers (Hamilton, Sutil, Sebastian Vettel, Paul di Resta, Lucas di Grassi, and Giedo van der Garde) have competed in Formula One.

Summary
The 2005 calendar included events at the historic circuits of Pau (France), Spa-Fracorchamps (Belgium), Zandvoort (Netherlands) and Monaco. Monaco has a long tradition of Formula 3 events, but this was the first since 1997. The debut of a new street circuit in the French town of Avignon was to take place in September, but the plans fell through and its date was given to the Lausitzring.

Thirteen countries were represented in the drivers' entry list, which included drivers from Argentina, the USA and the Czech Republic for the first time. There were teams from France, Germany, Britain, Austria, Italy, Netherlands, Luxembourg and the Czech Republic.

After a promising debut season with Manor Motorsport that ended with a win in the non-championship Bahrain F3 Superprix, and a contract with ASM for 2005, Lewis Hamilton was regarded as the championship favourite. He exceeded expectations by winning 15 races from 20 starts, securing 13 pole positions, posting ten fastest race laps, and scoring nearly twice as many points as his nearest rival, team-mate Adrian Sutil. Lucas di Grassi made a full-time return to the series (he entered two rounds in 2003) and finished in 3rd place overall, with one win. The highest-placed rookie was the then-reigning Formula BMW Germany champion Sebastian Vettel, who was classified 5th overall with six podium finishes. He was beaten to 4th place by Franck Perera's more consistent points finishes.

In the Teams’ Championship, ASM Formule 3 retained the title that it had secured in 2004, with Signature in a distant second place. Third place was taken by Prema Powerteam, which had won the Euro Series' first teams' title in 2003. Manor Motorsport was classified 4th overall, as it continued to improve its form against rivals with more experience in Europe. At this time, the Spiess-Opel engine was still numerically dominant, but won on only two occasions. HWA-Mercedes had begun to gain the upper hand in 2004 (with 13 wins from 20 races), and increased its development effort to win 18 races in 2005.

Teams and drivers

Driver changes
 Changed Teams
 Marco Bonanomi: Team Ghinzani → Prema Powerteam
 Loïc Duval: Signature → Signature Plus
 Gregory Franchi: Signature → Prema Powerteam
 Giedo van der Garde: Signature → Team Rosberg
 Maximilian Götz: TME → HBR Motorsport
 Lewis Hamilton: Manor Motorsport → ASM Formule 3
 Kohei Hirate: Prema Powerteam → Team Rosberg
 Alejandro Núñez: Swiss Racing Team → HBR Motorsport
 Ross Zwolsman: TME – RZ Racing

 Entering/Re-Entering Formula 3 Euro Series
 Átila Abreu: Formula BMW ADAC (ADAC Mittelrhein e.V.) → Mücke Motorsport
 Richard Antinucci: All-Japan Formula Three Championship (TOM's) → Team Midland Euroseries
 Rob Austin: British Formula 3 Championship (Menu F3 Motorsport) → Team Midland Euroseries
 Fabio Carbone: All-Japan Formula Three Championship (Three Bond Racing) → Signature
 Ben Clucas: Formula Renault 2.0 Italy (Prema Powerteam) → Team Midland Euroseries
 Lucas di Grassi: British Formula 3 Championship (Hitech Racing) → Manor Motorsport
 Esteban Guerrieri: International Formula 3000  (BCN F3000) → Team Midland Euroseries
 Thomas Holzer: German Formula Three Championship (AM-Holzer Rennsport) → AM-Holzer Rennsport
 Stephen Jelley: British Formula 3 Championship (Performance Racing Europe) → Team Midland Euroseries
 Julia Kuhn: Formula Volkswagen Germany → Kuhn Motorsport
 Paolo Montin: All-Japan Formula Three Championship (Three Bond Racing) → Ombra Racing
 Guillaume Moreau:	Championnat de France Formula Renault 2.0 & Eurocup Formula Renault 2.0 (SG Formula)
 Paul di Resta: Formula Renault 2.0 UK (Manor Motorsport) → Manor Motorsport
 James Rossiter: British Formula 3 Championship (Fortec Motorsport) → Signature Plus
 Filip Salaquarda: German Formula Three Championship (Team I.S.R.) → Team I.S.R.
 Nico Verdonck: International Formula 3000  (Team Astromega) → Team Midland Euroseries
 Sebastian Vettel: Formula BMW ADAC (ADAC Berlin-Brandenburg) → Mücke Motorsport
 Danny Watts: British Formula 3 Championship (Promatecme F3) → HBR Motorsport

 Leaving Formula 3 Euro Series
 Philipp Baron: Team Ghinzani → Ferrari Challenge Europe – Trofeo Pirelli (Baron Service)
 Ruben Carrapatoso: Opel Team KMS → StockCar Brasil (Katalogo Racing)
 Peter Elkmann: Swiss Racing Team → Recaro Formel 3 Cup (Jo Zeller Racing)
 Dennis Furchheim: Swiss Racing Team → Retirement
 Jamie Green: ASM Formule 3 → Deutsche Tourenwagen Masters (Persson Motorsport)
 Derek Hayes: Team Ghinzani → Retirement
 Katsuyuki Hiranaka: Prema Powerteam → Formula Nippon (Takagi/Cerumo)
 Robert Kath: Opel Team KMS → Recaro Formel 3 Cup (SMS Seyffarth Motorsport)
 Tom Kimber-Smith: Team Kolles → Formula Renault 2.0 Netherlands & Formula Renault 2.0 UK (Team JLR)
 Robert Kubica: Mücke Motorsport → World Series by Renault (Epsilon Euskadi)
 Nicolas Lapierre: Signature → GP2 Series (Arden International)
 Alexandros Margaritis: AB Racing Performance → Deutsche Tourenwagen Masters (Mücke Motorsport)
 Christian Montanari: Coloni F3 → World Series by Renault (Draco Multiracing USA)
 Alexandre Prémat: ASM Formule 3 → GP2 Series (ART Grand Prix)
 Fernando Rees: Swiss Racing Team → World Series by Renault (Interwetten Racing)
 Daniel la Rosa: HBR Motorsport → World Series by Renault (Interwetten Racing)
 Nico Rosberg: Team Rosberg → GP2 Series (ART Grand Prix)
 Eric Salignon: ASM Formule 3 → World Series by Renault (Cram Competition)
 Bruno Spengler: Mücke Motorsport → Deutsche Tourenwagen Masters (Persson Motorsport)
 Roberto Streit: Prema Powerteam → All-Japan Formula Three Championship (Inging)
 Toni Vilander: Coloni F3 → Italian Formula 3000 (Team Astromega & GP Racing) & GP2 Series (Coloni Motorsport)
 Andreas Zuber: Team Rosberg → World Series by Renault (Carlin Motorsport)
 Charles Zwolsman Jr.: Manor Motorsport → Toyota Atlantic Championship Presented by Yokohama (Condor Motorsports)

Midseason changes
Maximilian Götz left HBR Motorsport after four rounds, to be replaced by Danny Watts, making his Euro Series debut. Watts was able to stay for only one round, and the HBR line-up was subsequently reduced to two cars. Götz returned at the final round as a substitute for Adrian Sutil at ASM. Sutil's absence was due to commitments in the A1 Grand Prix series. Five drivers shared Team Midland's #19 car. Richard Antinucci competed in the first four rounds, before Nico Verdonck of Belgium replaced him at Oschersleben and the Norisring. He in turn was replaced by three British drivers, all Euro Series rookies: Stephen Jelley at the Nürburgring, Rob Austin at the Lausitzring and Zandvoort, and Ben Clucas in the final round of the season at Hockenheim. A number of registered drivers failed to complete the season, including Paulo Montin, who made only two starts with Ombra Racing; and Julia Kuhn, who made two starts in round 1 and attempted (but failed) to qualify for the first race of round 10. RZ Racing left the series after round 9 at Oschersleben.

Calendar

Season standings

Drivers Standings
Points are awarded as follows:

† — Drivers did not finish the race, but were classified as they completed over 90% of the race distance.

Rookie Cup
Rookie drivers are only eligible for the Rookie Cup title if they have not previously competed in a national or international Formula 3 championship.

Team Standings

Nations Cup

Notes

References

External links
Forix.autosport.com
Speedsport Magazine
Formel3guide.com (German language)
F1Prospects.com

Formula 3 Euro Series seasons
Formula 3 Euro Series
Euro Series
Formula 3 Euro Series